Gray Lock (or Greylock, born  Wawanotewat, Wawanolet, or Wawanolewat), was a Western Abenaki warrior chieftain of Woronoco/Pocumtuck ancestry who came to lead the Missisquoi Abenaki band, and whose direct descendants have led the Missisquoi Abenaki until the current day. Born around 1670 near what is now Westfield, Massachusetts, he eventually became the most illustrious and prominent leader to arise among the dwindling Waranoak, once the predominant original inhabitants of the central Connecticut River Valley in today's New England region.

Dummer's War
The mid-1720s conflict known as Dummer's War (also known as Greylock's War, Three Years War, Lovewell's War, Father Rasle's War, or the 4th Indian War) was a series of battles and raids between the region's English colonists and groups of the Wabanaki Confederacy. The legendary Chief Gray Lock rose to prominence during this period, marshaling and organizing Native resistance based in Otter Creek and, further to the northwest, on the Missisquoi near today's Swanton, both in what is now Vermont.

French colonists and traders are recorded as the first Europeans to explore the Kennebec River area, in what is now Maine, with Samuel Champlain arriving in 1604 and claiming the area for France. Soon afterward, however, English colonists began to homestead lands along the Kennebec long occupied by the Abenaki Indians, who regarded them as their own. As the pattern of English colonial settlements in the area continued, the French and Abenaki formed an alliance against them.

The rising tensions erupted into open conflict in 1722. With the French, New York English colonists, and the Iroquois looking on, Abenaki war parties commenced raiding the expanding English northern-tier colonial settlements of the Massachusetts Bay Colony, all the way from coastal Maine to Lake Champlain. Gray Lock rapidly distinguished himself as the pre-eminent Abenaki military leader, conducting frequent and successful guerrilla raids in areas of what are now southern Vermont and western Massachusetts. He consistently eluded his pursuers, acquiring among his peers the warrior's name of Wawanolet (v. Wawanolewat, Wawanotewat), which means roughly "he who fools the others, or puts someone off the track."

In August 1723, he led a war party which descended upon the English colonial settlements at Northfield and Rutland, escaping with captive settlers. The English colonial militia were mustered and put on high alert, but in October Gray Lock once again attacked Northfield, escaping safely. With additional settler troops being raised and deployed as a result, early in 1724, by Massachusetts Bay Colony decree, a blockhouse, known as Fort Dummer, was erected by the colonists on the west bank of the Connecticut about ten miles north of Northfield, immediately south of today's Brattleboro, Vermont, to help guard against future attacks. The colonial garrisons already established at Northfield, displacing the Abenaki from their traditional winter hunting grounds and camps, were strengthened as well.

The last of these settler parties withdrew from the field in March and April 1725, whereupon Gray Lock's contingent left their winter quarters, again throwing the settlements into a state of alarm. Intending reprisals, Captain Benjamin Wright set out in July for Missisquoi with a body of recruits, but having provisioned inadequately, aborted their mission and returned south. Gray Lock dogged Wright all the way to Northfield, with alarms and skirmishes continuing in and around Fort Dummer and Deerfield for the remainder of the summer months.

Eastern Abenaki groups made peace with Massachusetts in 1725 and 1726, and Abenaki bands in Canada agreed to peace terms in 1727, but Gray Lock refused, mounting sporadic raids on the colonies over the next two decades or so. The best available accounts indicate that Gray Lock died a free man around 1750, his name already a legend even among his enemies, and with family and stalwart followers around him.

Legacy
Mount Greylock in Western Massachusetts is thought to have been named in tribute to chief Gray Lock. Although it is not clear whether chief Gray Lock was actually ever personally associated with this mountain, the name "Mount Greylock" first appeared in print around 1819, and came into popular use by the 1830s.

There is a monument and plaque dedicated to Chief Gray Lock in Battery Park (Burlington, Vermont).

Notable descendants
Jean-Paul Nolet  (born Wawanoloath)
Alexis Wawanoloath 
Christine Sioui-Wawanoloath 
Monique Sioui

See also
 Mount Greylock State Reservation. Retrieved July 25, 2009.
 "Greylock: Great Chief of the Abenaki" , by James P. Millard. Retrieved July 25, 2009.
 "The Hoosac Valley: Its Legends and its History", by Grace Greylock Niles (1912)

References

The Western Abenakis of Vermont, 1600-1800: War, Migration, and the survival of an Indian people, by Colin G. Calloway (University of Oklahoma Press, 1990)
The Original Vermonters: Native Inhabitants, Past and Present, by William A. Haviland and Marjory W. Power (University Press of New England, 1994)
In Search of New England's Native Past: Selected Essays, by Gordon M. Day (Amherst: University of Massachusetts Press, 1998)

People in Father Rale's War
1670s births
1750s deaths
English colonization of the Americas
Native American leaders
Native American history of Massachusetts
History of the Americas
History of the Thirteen Colonies
Native American people from Massachusetts
Abenaki